Patriotic Martyr An Jung-gun (의사 안중근 - Uisa Ahn Jung-geun) is a 1972 South Korean film directed by Joo Dong-jin. It was chosen as Best Film at the Grand Bell Awards.

Plot
A film biography of An Jung-geun, a Korean independence activist who assassinated Itō Hirobumi, the first Prime Minister of Japan.

Cast
Kim Jin-kyu
Park Nou-sik
Moon Jung-suk
Han Mun-jeong
Choi Nam-Hyun
Choi Bool-am
Lee Dae-yub
Hah Myung-joong
Choe Seong-ho
Park Am

References

Bibliography

External links

1972 films
Best Picture Grand Bell Award winners
1970s Korean-language films
South Korean drama films